Daniel Melo  (born July 4, 1977, in Belo Horizonte, Brazil) is a former professional tennis player from Brazil. He is the older brother of Marcelo Melo, also a tennis player.

Melo has won one ATP Tour title, 2001 Brasil Open doubles title when, together with Enzo Artoni, he defeated Gastón Etlis and Brent Haygarth in the final 6–3, 1–6, 7–6.

Career titles

Doubles (1)

References

External links 
 
 

1977 births
Living people
Brazilian male tennis players
Sportspeople from Belo Horizonte
Tennis players at the 1999 Pan American Games
Pan American Games competitors for Brazil